The Grissom Air Museum is a military aviation museum at Grissom Air Reserve Base near Peru, Indiana with over twenty aircraft on display.

History
The museum's origins date to 1981, when the Grissom Air Force Base Heritage Museum Foundation was formed by John Crume and other military veterans to preserve the aircraft located at the base. The Grissom Air Museum was started in 1987 when aircraft were moved to an area outside the northern main gate from a location on base.

The indoor museum was completed in 1991. Its fortunes began to decline in 1992, when the Air Force announced that six airplanes at the museum would be transferred to other sites. Less than a year later, a feasibility study suggested that the museum needed new leadership and additional funding. After another year the situation had improved, with enough money being raised to keep the airplanes on location. In 1995, the museum was transferred from the United States Air Force Museum system to the Indiana State Museum and Historic Sites system. The museum obtained two "new-in-box" Quonset huts for additional display space in 1997. Then, in 2010, the museum was dropped from the latter system.

In 2015, the museum's B-17 was disassembled and transferred to the Museum of Aviation for restoration. By 2020, the museum was raising funds to construct a shelter for the B-58.

Collection

The museum has over twenty aircraft on outdoor display, reflecting both the base's history and that of the United States Air Force and the United States Navy.  The indoor museum contains a number of artifacts related to the United States Naval Training Station at Bunker Hill (1942–46), Bunker Hill Air Force Base (1954-1968), the Grissom Air Force Base (1968-1994), and the Grissom Air Reserve Base (1994–Present). Other sit-in displays, including an F-4 Phantom cockpit, Huey Helicopter, MJ-1 Bomb Loader, A-10 Trainer, and an F-16 Mock Cockpit.

Aircraft

 Bell UH-1H Iroquois 68-16256
 Boeing B-47B Stratojet 51-2315
 Boeing EC-135L 61-0269
 Boeing KC-97L Stratofreighter 52-2697
 Cessna O-2A Skymaster 68-6871
 Cessna T-37B Tweet 54-2736
 Cessna U-3A 57-5922
 Douglas TA-4J Skyhawk 153671
 Convair TB-58A Hustler 55-0663
 Convair TF-102A Delta Dagger 56-2317
 Douglas C-47D Skytrain 43-49270
 Fairchild C-119G Flying Boxcar 52-5850
 Fairchild Republic A-10A Thunderbolt II 77-0228
 Grumman C-1A Trader 136790
 Grumman F-11A Tiger 141790
 Grumman F-14B Tomcat 162912
 Lockheed T-33A 52-9563
 McDonnell F-4C Phantom II 64-0783
 McDonnell F-101B Voodoo 58-0321
 NAMC YS-11A
 North American B-25J Mitchell 44-86843
 North American F-100C Super Sabre 53-1712
 North American T-2C Buckeye 158583
 Republic F-84F Thunderstreak 51-9456
 Republic F-105D Thunderchief 61-0088

Indoor exhibits
The cabin of a HH-1K and the cockpit of a F-4C are on display inside the museum building.

Tower
The entire Grissom Air Reserve Base and aircraft display are visible from the top of the five-story Cold War-era Observation Tower.

Events
Events on location include the Open House, Armed Forces Day Celebration, GUS Fly In, and Warbird Cruise-In.

See also
B-17G "Flying Fortress" No. 44-83690

References

External links

 Grissom Air Museum 

Aerospace museums in Indiana
Military and war museums in Indiana
Museums in Miami County, Indiana
Museums established in 1981
1981 establishments in Indiana